That Old Feeling is a 1997 American romantic comedy film directed by Carl Reiner, his final film as director before his death in 2020. It stars Bette Midler and Dennis Farina.

Plot 
Molly de Mora (Paula Marshall) invites her divorced parents (Bette Midler and Dennis Farina) to her wedding, where they see each other for the first time in 14 years. During the reception a shouting match between the two ensues. Following this, their spark is rekindled. Over the next few days they fall in love again and run off together, thereby upsetting the newlyweds' honeymoon and their respective (current) spouses. If the scandal was made public it would be more controversial than usual, since the bride's husband hopes to stand for election to Congress. After searching for her parents and getting to know Joey Donna (Danny Nucci), her mother's number one paparazzi nicknamed "The Cockroach", whom she hires to help her find them, Molly decides that her parents deserve a chance to be together and gives them her honeymoon to Hawaii. When Keith objects to her decision, it is revealed that he slept with her stepmother. Knowing now that her marriage was a mistake, Molly runs off with Joey as her parents run off to Hawaii.

Cast
 Bette Midler as Lilly Leonard
 Dennis Farina as Dan de Mora
 Paula Marshall as Molly de Mora
 Gail O'Grady as Rowena
 David Rasche as Alan
 James Denton as Keith Marks
 Danny Nucci as Joey Donna
 Blu Mankuma as Piano Player
 Jayne Eastwood as Aunt Iris
 Michael J. Reynolds as Senator Marks
 Joan Luchak as Senator Marks' Wife
 Lula Franklin as Granny Tapper
 Mike Wilmot as Man at Wedding
 George Hevenor as Bandleader
 Arlene Meadows as Inn Proprietress
 Don Allison as Desk Clerk
 Ian D. Clark as Rufus
 David Huband as Cop
 Tony Craig as Cop
 Kim Bourne as Waitress
 Cara Chisholm as Waitress

Production
It was written by Leslie Dixon, who also wrote Bette Midler's 1987 film Outrageous Fortune. Dixon came up with the idea for That Old Feeling in the early 1990s, after watching her own divorced parents act friendly to each other. She specifically had Midler in mind, who liked the original spec script, but was locked into an exclusive contract with Disney at the time. Because of this, Dixon had to wait several years for Midler to become available before she could proceed with the project. When Dennis Farina got cast as Midler's husband, she rewrote his character as a crime novelist, in order to accommodate his gruff persona.

Release and reception
That Old Feeling met with mixed reviews from critics, with a 43% "Rotten" rating on Rotten Tomatoes, however 60% of fans like it. The film opened at #4 at the North American box office during April 1997, making $5.1 million USD in its opening weekend. Lawrence Van Gelder gave the film a positive review in The New York Times, calling it a "raucous, high-spirited romantic comedy, which zips along under the direction of Carl Reiner, working from a script by the sharp-witted Leslie Dixon." Los Angeles Times critic John Anderson stated that it was a "very traditional comedy in a surreal sort of way" and "generally fun, thanks to old pros Midler and Farina, and Nucci, who plays Joey as a combination Joe Pesci-Jerry Lewis." Chris Hicks of Deseret News labelled it "[a] anti-family values comedy", and claimed "the film never quite lives up to its first feisty 15 or 20 minutes." The Chicago Tribune'''s Mark Caro criticized the film, writing, "Instead of focusing on how this couple re-explores their relationship after 14 years of estrangement, the movie scatters its attentions among a group of mostly unpleasant characters. Marshall projects a good-humored sweetness as Molly, but Denton's Keith is a stuffed shirt from the start, which is explained by the easy joke that he's a Republican. Lilly's husband, Alan (David Rasche), is a spineless New Agey therapist, and Dan's wife, Rowena, is a plastic surgery-enhanced shrew portrayed by former NYPD Blue bombshell Gail O'Grady, who's too young to be playing such a gross caricature."

It was subsequently released to VHS on October 7, 1997, and then to DVD on April 28, 1998. In January 1998, Siskel and Ebert included That Old Feeling'' on their "Worst Films of 1997" episode.

References

External links 
 
 
 
 

1997 romantic comedy films
1997 films
American romantic comedy films
Comedy of remarriage films
Films about weddings
Films scored by Patrick Williams
Films directed by Carl Reiner
Films with screenplays by Leslie Dixon
Universal Pictures films
Adultery in films
1990s English-language films
1990s American films